Tam Shui Hang is a village in the Sha Tau Kok area of North District of Hong Kong. The village is divided into upper (Sheung Tam Shui Hang), middle and lower (Ha Tam Shui Hang) parts.

Administration
Tam Shui Hang is a recognized village under the New Territories Small House Policy. It is one of the villages represented within the Sha Tau Kok District Rural Committee. For electoral purposes, Tam Shui Hang is part of the Sha Ta constituency, which is currently represented by Ko Wai-kei.

History
The three Hakka villages of Tam Shui Hang, Tong To and Shan Tsui had a total population of around 1,000 persons in
1961. During the Cultural Revolution, the villagers of these three places removed a Tin Hau image from a Man Mo temple located across the border in Mainland China and built a temple at the western end of Kong Ha Village to house the image. The temple was under the management of a special trust, the Sam Wo Tong.

Features
The Kwan Ah School in Tam Shui Hang ceased operation in 2004.

References

External links

 Delineation of area of existing village Tam Shui Hang (Sha Tau Kok) for election of resident representative (2019 to 2022)
 Film Services Office: Tam Shui Hang Tsuen (includes pictures)

Villages in North District, Hong Kong
Sha Tau Kok